Pamantasan ng Lungsod ng Muntinlupa (PLMun) is a local university in the Philippines.

PLMun Board of Regents

Atty. Jaime R. Fresnedi, Chairman of BOR and Muntinlupa Mayor
Vice Mayor Artemio Simundac, Vice Chairman

Members
Coun. Paty Katy Boncayao Chairman of Education Committee
Dr. Elena E. Presnedi, OIC, PLMun
Dr. Dominico Idanan, School Division Superintendent
Ms. Elvie Sanchez-Quiazon, General Manager, Vivere Hotel and Resorts
Ms. Farah Acierto, President, Soroptimist ALabang
Director Jose B. Patalinjug III, Regional Director, DOST NCR
Dr. Reynaldo Samson, MPC-PLMun Alumni Association President
Assoc. Prof. Antonio Flores, PLMun Faculty Association President
Ms. Stephanie Radaza, University Student Council President

Academic Offerings

Undergraduate programs

College of Arts and Sciences (CAS)
 Bachelor of Arts in Communication
 Bachelor of Arts in Political Science
 Bachelor of Science in Psychology

College of Business Administration (CBA)
 Bachelor of Science in Business Administration
 Major in Human Resource Development Management
 Major in Marketing Management
 Major in Operations Management
 Bachelor of Science in Accountancy

College of Criminal Justice (CCJ)
 Bachelor of Science in Criminology

College of Information, Technology and Computer Studies (CITCS)
 Bachelor of Science in Computer Science
 Bachelor of Science in Information Technology
 Associate in Computer Technology

College of Teacher Education
 Bachelor of Elementary Education (BEEd)
 General Elementary Education
Early Childhood Education (ECED)
 Special Education (SPED)
 Bachelor of Secondary Education (BSEd)
 Major in Biological Science
 Major in English
 Major in Filipino
 Major in Mathematics
 Major in Social Science
 Major in Music, Arts Physical Education and Health (MAPEH)

Graduate studies

Master in Business Administration
Master of Arts in Education, major in Educational Management
Master of Arts in Education, major in Guidance and Counseling
Master in Security and Correctional Administration
Master in Information Technology
Master of Science in Criminology

Special program
Graduates of Non-Education degrees shall take 18 units of Professional Education courses to qualify for the Licensure Examination for Teachers

Curricular offerings
The university offers courses such as Bachelor of Education in Elementary and Secondary Educations, Bachelor of Science in Computer Science, Criminology, and Commerce, Marketing and Management courses, Associate in Computer Technology, Bachelor of Arts in Liberal Arts majors in Psychology, Political Science, Mass Communication and Certificate of Teaching Proficiency for non-education graduates who wants to pursue a teaching profession and a Certificate of Teaching in Early Childhood Education.

Graduate school offers MBA, MaEd and Master in Criminology
It also maintains a Center for Research and Extension Services and serves as a review center for teachers and criminology board exams.

Scholarship
The University offers free tuition and exemption from other fees through the UNIFAST Law.

See also
Local college and university (Philippines)
Association of Local Colleges and Universities
Pamantasan
Alculympics

References

External links
Geocities site
Muntinlupa hosts Int'l Youth Day rites
Plmunster.com: student social network

Educational institutions established in 1991
Local colleges and universities in Metro Manila
Education in Muntinlupa
1991 establishments in the Philippines